Brandon Clint Russell is a Bahamian American Neo-Nazi leader and the founder of the Atomwaffen Division.

Creation of Atomwaffen
Russell, who went by the handle "Odin", first appeared on the Iron March on March 22, 2014, at age 18. Iron March was a far-right neo-fascist and neo-Nazi web forum. The site opened in 2011 and attracted Neo-fascist and Neo-Nazi members, including militants from organized far-right groups and members who would later go on to commit acts of terror. Russell would create contacts with American and international neo-Nazis and in an October 2015 post on Iron March, he announced the formation of Atomwaffen Division that had been three years in the making. He stated that Atomwaffen was for very fanatical, ideological people who do military training, absolutely "no keyboard warriors". Dozens responded to the thread, which stated they had 40 members across the U.S., mostly in Florida.

In addition to creating the organization in the United States, he would visit Atomwaffen's ideological comrades, National Action, in the United Kingdom. Russell also went to meet with the leaderships of Golden Dawn, Nordic Resistance Movement, Russian Imperial Movement and CasaPound in a neo-Nazi event in Russian Federation in 2015.

Involvement in terror plots

Tampa murders and subsequent first arrest
In May 2017, Devon Arthurs was accused of killing two of his roommates and fellow Atomwaffen Division members with an assault rifle. Arthurs was arrested following a hostage situation, during which he allegedly told police that he shot 22-year-old Jeremy Himmelman and 18-year-old Andrew Oneschuk earlier that day. On the night of Devon Arthurs' arrest, his third roommate, a 21-year-old, Brandon Russell was also arrested and questioned by local police and the FBI. While it was determined that Russell was not involved in the homicides and was released, the deaths drew investigators' attention to a large stash of explosives at the same location.

When the authorities searched Russell's garage, they found explosive precursors ammonium nitrate, nitromethane, homemade detonators and an explosive compound hexamethylene triperoxide diamine. HMTD has been used to make improvised explosive devices by groups such as al-Qaeda, and ammonium nitrate and nitromethane were used by Timothy McVeigh, the perpetrator of the Oklahoma City bombing. The authorities also found thorium and americium, two radioactive substances, in Russell's bedroom. Russell, a former student of nuclear physics at the University of South Florida and a Florida Army National Guardsman, had a framed photograph of Timothy McVeigh in his bedroom. The authorities also discovered guns, various Atomwaffen paraphernalia and neo-Nazi propaganda.

The FBI issued an arrest warrant for Russell on explosives charges and the FBI bulletin warned he might be planning a terrorist attack. Russell was arrested again with another member in Monroe County. The car they were driving contained assault rifles, body armor and more than 1000 rounds of ammunition which they had acquired after the shooting. Russell claimed the explosives were used to power model rockets, but according to an FBI bomb technician the explosives were powerful enough to destroy an airliner. The prosecutors alleged Russell "planned to use the explosives to harm civilians, nuclear facilities and synagogues."

In September 2017, Russell pleaded guilty in federal court to possessing an unregistered destructive device and illegally storing explosives; in January 2018, he was sentenced to five years in prison for those crimes. While in jail awaiting sentencing, he sent bomb-making instructions to his followers.

While less than six months into his five-year sentence he issued a statement recorded inside United States Penitentiary in Atlanta. Russell thanked his comrades for their "undying loyalty and courage," and issued a warning: "There is no room in this world for cowardly people...The sword has been drawn. There is no turning back." He was released from prison August 23, 2021.

Baltimore attack plot
In February 2023, a federal grand jury indicted Russell for allegedly conspiring with Sarah Clendaniel, a woman from Maryland, on planning attacks on electric substations in the Baltimore area. Russell allegedly shared open-source maps of infrastructure and pointed out substations he said would cause a "cascading failure" if they were taken out.

In popular culture
Karin Slaughter's book The Last Widow features Brandon Russell as a Neo-Nazi leader.

References

1995 births
American neo-Nazis
American prisoners and detainees
Criminals from Florida
21st-century American criminals
Living people
American people of Bahamian descent
Prisoners and detainees of the United States federal government